The 1946 Little Three Conference football season was the season of college football played by the three member schools of the Little Three Conference as part of the 1946 college football season.

The Wesleyan Cardinals won the Little Three championship with a perfect 7–0 record and outscored opponents by a total of 165 to 29.

Conference overview

Teams

Wesleyan

The 1946 Wesleyan Cardinals football team represented Wesleyan University of Middletown, Connecticut. In their second season under head coach Norm Daniels, the Cardinals compiled a perfect 7–0 record, won the Little Three championship, and outscored opponents by a total of 165 to 29. The team ranked 10th nationally among small-college teams in total offense with an average of 267.9 yards per game. It was the first perfect season in the 71-year history of the Wesleyan football program.

Jack Medd was the team captain. Johnny Wood was an assistant coach. The Cardinals played their home games at North Field in Middletown.

During the fall of 1946, there were 910 student enrolled at Wesleyan.

Williams

The 1946 Williams Ephs football team represented Williams College of Williamstown, Massachusetts. In their first year under head coach A. Barr Snively, the Cardinals compiled a 2–5 record, finished second in the Little Three, and were outscored by a total of 90 to 40.

Amherst

The 1946 Amherst Lord Jeffs football team represented Amherst College of Amherst, Massachusetts. In their 13th year under head coach Lloyd Jordan, the Lord Jeffs compiled a  3–4 record, finished third in the Little Three, and were outscored by a total of 120 to 84.

References